Yevhen Serhiyovych Selin (Ukrainian: Євген Сергійович Селін; born 9 May 1988) is a Ukrainian professional footballer who plays as a left back or centre back for Chornomorets Odesa.

Club career
Selin was born in Voroshylovhrad Oblast, Ukrainian SSR.

Metalist Kharkiv
He signed for Metalist Kharkin in 2007, where he played for the reserves before making his way into the senior side during the 2008–09 season.

Vorskla Poltava
On 10 June 2010, he left Metalist and joined Ukrainian Premier League rivals Vorskla Poltava on loan without a signing option.

Asteras Tripolis
On 20 December 2016, Asteras Tripolis officially announced the signing of Selin from FC Dynamo Kyiv until the summer of 2018. He had a successful loan spell with Platanias in the 2015–16 season.

MTK Budapest
In summer 2018 he moved to MTK Budapest in Nemzeti Bajnokság I, where he played 24 games and scored 1 goal.

Desna Chernihiv
On 15 July 2021 he signed a contract for one year with Desna Chernihiv in the Ukrainian Premier League. On 25 July, he debuted for his new club against Chornomorets Odesa. On 21 September he played against Metalist Kharkiv in the 2021–22 Ukrainian Cup. On 7 November 2021, he scored as an 80th-minute substitute against Lviv.

Chornomorets Odesa
On 21 June 2022 he signed a 2-year contract with Chornomorets Odesa.

International career
Selin was called up to the Ukraine under-21 national team in 2008. On 7 October 2011 he made his senior debut for Ukraine and netted a goal in a 3–0 home win against Bulgaria in an friendly.

Outside of professional football
In March 2022, during the Siege of Chernihiv, together with other former Desna players he helped raise money for the civilian population of the city of Chernihiv.

Career statistics

Club

International

International goals
Scores and results list Ukraine's goal tally first, score column indicates score after each Selin goal.

Honours 
Dynamo Kyiv
Ukrainian Premier League: (1) 2014–15
Ukrainian Cup: (2) 2013-14, 2014–15
United Tournament (1): 2013

Anorthosis Famagusta
Cypriot Cup: 2020–21
Cypriot First Division: runner-up 2019–20

Gallery

References

External links
Profile on Official FC Desna Chernihiv website

 

1988 births
Living people
People from Poltava Oblast
Ukrainian footballers
Ukraine under-21 international footballers
Ukraine international footballers
Association football defenders
UEFA Euro 2012 players
Ukrainian Premier League players
FC Stal Alchevsk players
FC Metalist Kharkiv players
FC Vorskla Poltava players
FC Dynamo Kyiv players
Super League Greece players
Platanias F.C. players
Asteras Tripolis F.C. players
Nemzeti Bajnokság I players
MTK Budapest FC players
Anorthosis Famagusta F.C. players
FC Desna Chernihiv players
FC Chornomorets Odesa players
Ukrainian expatriate footballers
Expatriate footballers in Greece
Ukrainian expatriate sportspeople in Greece
Expatriate footballers in Hungary
Ukrainian expatriate sportspeople in Hungary
Expatriate footballers in Cyprus
Ukrainian expatriate sportspeople in Cyprus
Sportspeople from Luhansk Oblast